Orange creamsicle cake is a cake containing orange and vanilla flavors that is named after the Popsicle-brand "Creamsicle" ice cream treat on a stick: a vanilla ice cream center coated in orange-flavored popsicle ice. A traditional version might just be an orange- and vanilla-flavored bundt cake, but there are no-bake versions of the cake made with ice cream and pudding, and other versions made with cakes that are frosted or served with orange marmalade.

Ice cream cakes
Some versions of the cake are no bake ice cream cakes made with orange and vanilla layers. The layers can be made with vanilla ice cream and orange sherbet over a vanilla wafer crust, although there is a lot of flexibility in how the cake is assembled, like using gingersnaps or white cake for the crust, or frozen yogurt instead of vanilla ice cream. Pound cake is used in some recipes to line a loaf pan, then the pound cake shell is filled with orange sherbet and the top is covered with pound cake. The sherbet filled pound cake loaf is left in the fridge to set for several hours before it is frosted with vanilla frosting.

Angel food cake
Other versions are made with angel food cake which can be flavored with orange-marmalade or orange zest and frosted with an orange and vanilla flavored whipped custard, or simply with orange marmalade.

Other
Another version of the cake can be made by frosting orange cake with vanilla pudding frosting.

See also
 List of cakes

References

Vanilla ice cream
Frozen desserts
American cakes
No bake cakes
Citrus dishes